Lewis James Hamilton Gunn (14 May 1918 – 11 February 2014) was a Canadian cricketer. Gunn was born in Edinburgh, Scotland. He was a right-handed batsman and right-arm medium pace bowler. He played two first-class matches for Canada, one in 1951 and 1954, making a top score of 46.

References
Cricket Archive profile
Cricinfo profile

1918 births
2014 deaths
Canadian cricketers
Cricketers from Edinburgh
British emigrants to Canada